Ngao may refer to:

 Ngao (weapon), a Thai polearm
 Ngao, Kenya
 Ngao District, Lampang Province, Thailand
 Ngao River, a river in Northern Thailand, tributary of the Yom River
 Ngao River (Yuam), a river in Northern Thailand, tributary of the Yuam River
 Ngao, Thoeng, a village and subdistrict of Thoeng District, Chiang Rai Province, Thailand
Ngao of Vientiane, prince of Vientiane, took part in Lao rebellion (1826–1828)